Bolton is a small suburban town in Tolland County, Connecticut, United States. The population was 4,858 as of the 2020 census. Bolton was incorporated in October 1720 and is governed by town meeting, with a first selectman and board of selectman as well as other boards serving specific functions. Bolton was named after a town of the same name in England, also located near Manchester.

History

Originally part of the town of Hartford, the area was referred to as Hartford Mountains or Hanover, until incorporation in October 1720. On 11 November 1723, Jonathan Edwards was installed as the pastor of Bolton.

Bolton was known for its high quality schist stone in the 18th century, and many tombstone carvers such as Gershom Bartlett and Jonathan Loomis sourced their stone from Bolton quarries.

Bolton was removed from Hartford County when Tolland County was originally formed on 13 October 1785. The northern half of Bolton was set aside in 1808 to form the town of Vernon. Quarries played a significant role in the area's developing economy, and Bolton Notch became the location of the small community of Quarryville. Prior to the railroad, granite was taken by oxcart to the Connecticut River where it was then shipped to major cities on the East Coast.

The Bolton historical society has been actively purchasing sites throughout the town in their effort to preserve the town's history and rural character. The most recent of these purchases was Rose's Farm, a several hundred-acre site where the Comte de Rochambeau camped with his troops.

Bolton has several restrictive ordinances designed to protect high housing prices for existing home owners and restrict new construction. Ordinances protecting existing businesses from competition also exist, such as those limiting the types and number of businesses. There is also a requirement that all new residential lots be no smaller than 1 acre, further keeping house prices artificially higher than they otherwise would likely be. The town features numerous parks, open spaces and trails.

Interstate 84 was originally planned to cut through the town on its way to Providence, going through Bolton Notch and the Hop River valley. Due to environmental concerns in both Rhode Island and in the Hop River valley, the highway would be cancelled in 1983. The segment that was built beforehand in the northwestern section of town, from CT 85 to US 6/US 44 would be redesignated at Interstate 384.

Bolton today is primarily residential with an economy made up mostly of small businesses. It is part of the Greater Hartford metro and contains many suburban homes, especially in its western side.

Climate

Bolton, like much of Tolland County, straddles the humid continental climate (Dfa) and (Dfb) line.

Education

Bolton High School is a public school with about two to three hundred students.  It underwent major renovations and expansion during 2011, including a new outdoor seating area for the cafeteria, a larger and more technologically advanced library, computer labs and media center, and a new science wing and larger administrative offices. Several other improvements were made including parking, bus lanes and the board of education offices being moved to the location.

The school has a student-teacher ratio of about 12:1 and a combined math and reading proficiency level of 92.5%. U.S. News & World Report ranked it #27 in Connecticut and #1030 in the United States, and it earned a Silver Award in 2012.

Bolton High is affiliated with the NCCC athletic conference.

Geography

This includes the Bolton Green Historic District and may include land owned or leased by the State of Connecticut and the U.S. federal government. Bolton doesn't have any unincorporated land.

Demographics

As of the census of 2010, there were 4,980 people, 1,915 households, and 1,438 families residing in the town. The town's residents are primarily middle-class, with some working class and upper middle-class families/individuals and small businesses. There are also a few larger commercial entities, notably the Simoniz corporation, specializing in automotive and car wash cleaning supplies.

The population density in 2010 was 346 people per square mile (133.5/km). There were 2,015 housing units in the town, of which 100, or 5.0%, were vacant. 86.7% of the occupied units are owned and 13.3% are rented.

The racial makeup of the town was 95.7% White, 1.1% African American, 0.1% Native American, 1.4% Asian, 0.2% some other race, and 1.5% two or more races. 3.00% of the population identified as Latino or Hispanic of any race (the US Census Bureau does not consider Latino a race).

The median age in 2010 was 45.4. 49.4% of the population were male and 50.6% female.

For the period 2012–2016, the estimated median household income was $91,087, and the median family income was $118,958. About 3.2% of the population are living below the poverty line.

Notable people

 Aloysius Ahearn, teacher and member of the Connecticut House of Representatives (1975–1977, 1979–1981)
 Ralph Earl, artist and portrait painter; died in Bolton in 1801
 Ron Hainsey, NHL alternate captain and defenseman for the Ottawa Senators and Stanley Cup champion
 Simeon Olcott, US Senator from New Hampshire; born in Bolton in 1735
 Julius L. Strong (1828–1872), U.S. Congressman
 George G. Sumner, politician; Connecticut House of Representative for Bolton; Mayor of Hartford; Lieutenant Governor and Governor of Connecticut; a native of Bolton
 William Williams, born in Bolton on September 6, 1815

References

External links

Town website
Bolton Public Schools
Bolton Historical Society

 
Towns in Tolland County, Connecticut
Towns in Connecticut
Greater Hartford